The Lithuanian A Lyga 1993–94 was the fourth season of top-tier football in Lithuania. The season started on 29 July 1993 and ended on 29 May 1994. It was contested by 12 teams, and ROMAR Mažeikiai won the championship.

Final table

Results

See also
1993 in Lithuanian football
1994 in Lithuanian football

References

LFF Lyga seasons
1993 in Lithuanian football
1994 in Lithuanian football
Lith